Eva Malin Maria Gjörup (28 April 1964 – 20 May 2020) was a Swedish actress and mezzo-soprano. She was sister to the actress, Fanny Gjörup (1961–2001), and stepdaughter to actor Håkan Serner.

Gjörup was born in Luleå. She studied at  Malmö Academy of Music and performed at the Gothenburg City Theatre, Riksteatern, and Folkoperan. She worked at Svenska konsertbyrån, and as a producer at Gävle Symphony Orchestra.

Later, she went on to the Norrlandsoperan in Umeå, Sweden, where she became opera manager and program manager for its symphony orchestra.
Gjörup died in May 2020, aged 56, from sudden cerebral haemorrhage.

Filmography

References

External links
 

People from Luleå
Swedish actresses
1964 births
2020 deaths
Swedish women singers
Swedish mezzo-sopranos